The Alfa Romeo Carabo is a concept car first shown at the 1968 Paris Motor Show. It was designed by Marcello Gandini, working for the Bertone design studio. The Carabo name is derived from the Carabidae beetles, as evoked by the car's iridescent green and orange coloring.

The wedge design came into fashion in the late 1960s. The Carabo is often considered the winner of the 'Wedge War' award of 1968 and as the direct predecessor of the Lamborghini Countach and having heavily influenced many car designs to follow well into the next decade. It was never intended for production but was fully functional and showcased features never expressed in any other car design of its day, including its wedge design and scissor doors.

The prototype was built on the chassis of an Alfa Romeo 33 Stradale (chassis No. 750.33.109.), which features a mid-mounted 2.0 L V8 engine mated to a 6-speed Colotti manual transmission.

The scissor doors later appeared on the Lamborghini Countach, which was also designed by Marcello Gandini.

References

External links 

 UltimateCarPage.com. Alfa Romeo Carabo Concept
 OldConceptCars.com. Alfa Romeo Carabo Photos
 ConceptCarz.com. 1968 Alfa Romeo Carabo
 Alfaromeoart.com. Official Alfa Romeo Carabo Art (archived)

Alfa Romeo concept vehicles
Bertone concept vehicles